A parka or anorak is a type of coat with a hood, often lined with fur or faux fur. This kind of garment is a staple of Inuit clothing, traditionally made from caribou or seal skin, for hunting and kayaking in the frigid Arctic. Some Inuit anoraks require regular coating with fish oil to retain their water resistance.

The words anorak and parka have been used interchangeably, but they are somewhat different garments. Strictly speaking, an anorak is a waterproof, hooded, pull-over jacket without a front opening, and sometimes drawstrings at the waist and cuffs, and a parka is a hip-length cold-weather coat, typically stuffed with down or very warm synthetic fiber, and with a fur-lined hood.

Etymology
The word anorak comes from the Greenlandic (Kalaallisut) word annoraaq. It did not appear in English until 1924; an early definition is "a beaded item worn by Greenland women or brides in the 1930s". In the early 1950s it was made from nylon, but changed to poplin by 1959, when it was featured in Vogue magazine as a fashion item. In 1984, The Observer used the term to refer to the type of people who wore it and subsequently, in the United Kingdom, it is sometimes used as a mildly derogatory term.

The word parka is derived from the Nenets language. In the Aleutian Islands the word simply means "animal skin". It first entered the English written record in a 1625 work by Samuel Purchas.

The Inuit who speak Inuktitut use parkas and have various terms related to them as follows:

Amauti

N-3B ("scrub snorkel" or "snorkel") parka

The original snorkel parka (USAF N-3B parka, which is 3/4 length and has a full, attached hood; the similar N-2B parka is waist-length and has an attached split hood) was developed in the United States during the early 1950s for military use, mainly for flight crews stationed in extremely cold areas. Originally made with a sage green DuPont flight silk nylon outer and lining it was padded with a wool blanket type material until the mid-1970s when the padding was changed to polyester wadding making the jacket both lighter and warmer. The outer shell material also was changed to a sage green cotton-nylon blend, with respective percentages 80–20, 65–35, and 50–50 being used at various times. 

It gained the common name of "snorkel parka" because the hood can be zipped right up leaving only a small tunnel (or snorkel) for the wearer to look out of.  This is particularly effective in very cold, windy weather although it has the added liabilities of seriously limiting the field of vision and hearing.  Earlier Vietnam-era hoods had genuine fur ruffs; later versions used synthetic furs. Original manufacturers of this parka for the government included Skyline, Southern Athletic, Lancer, Greenbrier, Workroom For Designers, Alpha, and Avirex. 

The basic N-3B parka design was copied and sold to the civilian market by many manufacturers with varying degrees of quality and faithfulness to the original government specifications. Surplus military parkas are often available for relatively low prices online and in surplus stores; they compare quite favorably with civilian extreme-cold parkas of all types due to their robust construction, designed for combat conditions, and warmth. 

The 1970s–1980s civilian version of the parka was made in many colors – navy blue, green, brown, black, maroon, grey, royal blue, sky blue and bright orange. Most had an orange diamond quilted nylon lining, although a very small number did have alternative colored linings such as yellow, pale blue, and green. While still manufacturing parkas to the military standard, Alpha Industries have more recently adopted the orange lining and a slimmer fit when producing their VF59 model parka which is now more popular than the military version.

In Europe the snorkel parka started to regain popularity in the late 1990s and early 2000s.

Fishtail parka

The fishtail parka was first used by the United States Army in 1950 during the Korean War. Following the end of the Second World War the US army recognized the need for a new cold weather combat system, resulting in four main styles of fishtail parka: the EX-48,  M-48, M-51 and the M-65. The M stands for model, and the number is the year it was standardized. The EX-48 model was the first prototype or "experimental" precursor to all of them. 
The M-48 then being the first actual production model fishtail parka after the pattern being standardized on December 24, 1948.

The name fishtail comes from the fish tail extension at the back that could be folded up between the legs, much like a Knochensack, and fixed using snap connectors to add wind-proofing. The fishtail was fixed at the front for warmth or folded away at the back to improve freedom of movement when needed.  

The EX-48 parka is distinctive as it has a left sleeve pocket and is made of thin poplin, only the later production M-48 parkas are made of the heavier sateen canvas type cotton. 
The EX-48 also has a thin fibre glass based liner that is very light and warm, the M-48 has a thicker wool pile liner with an integral hood liner made of wool. Both are distinguishable from any other type of parka by having the sleeve pocket. This was dropped for the M-51 onward. 
The fur ruff on the hood is also fixed to the shell of an EX-48/M-48 and is of wolf, coyote or often wolverine. The M-48 parka was costly to produce and therefore only in production for around one year. The pockets were wool lined both inside and out. The cuffs had two buttons for securing tightly around a wearer's wrist. The later more mass-produced M-51 parka had just the one cuff button. The liner had a built in chest pocket which again was unique to the M-48 parka.

The next revision was the M-51, made because the M48 was too expensive to mass-produce.

The outer hood of the M-51 Fishtail Parka is integral to the parka shell, an added hood liner as well as a button in main liner make the M-51 a versatile 3 piece parka.
The idea behind this 3 part system was to enable a more customisable parka that allowed for easier cleaning of the shell as the hood fur was on the detachable hood liner, not fixed to the shell as in the M-48. It also allowed for both liners to be buttoned in or our depending on the temperature and hence warmth required. It was also cheaper than the M-48 to mass-produce
The early M-51 was made of heavy sateen cotton, the same material as the M-48. Later revisions of the M-51 were poplin based. The later liners were also revised from the "heavy when wet" wool pile to a lighter woolen loop or frieze wool design that dried easier and were far lighter. The frieze liners were constructed of mohair and were designed using a double loop system which repelled cold weather. 

The M-65 fishtail parka has a detachable hood and was the last revision. It features a removable quilted liner made of light nylon / polyester batting which are modern synthetic materials. The M-65 fishtail parka first came into production in 1968.
These parkas featured synthetic fur on the hoods after an outcry from the fur lobby. As a result, only hoods for these parkas made in 1972 and for one year later have real fur.

Designed primarily for combat arms forces such as infantry, they are to be worn over other layers of clothing; alone, the fishtail parka is insufficient to protect against "dry cold" conditions (i.e. below about -10 °C). As such all fishtail parkas are big as they were designed to be worn over battle dress and other layers.

In the 1960s UK, the fishtail parka became a symbol of the mod subculture. Because of their practicality, cheapness and availability from military surplus shops, the parka was seen as the ideal garment for fending off the elements and protecting smarter clothes underneath from grease and dirt when on the mod's vehicle of choice, the scooter. Its place in popular culture was assured by newspaper pictures of parka-clad mods during the Bank Holiday riots of the 1960s.

Cagoule

A cagoule is the British English term for a lightweight, weatherproof anorak or parka, usually unlined and sometimes knee-length. A cagoule could be rolled up into a very compact package and carried in a bag or pocket. It was invented by Noel Bibby of Peter Storm Ltd. in the early 1960s. It may have a full-zippered front opening, or pull over the head like an original anorak and close with snaps or a short zipper, has an integral hood, and elasticated or drawstring cuffs. In some versions, when rolled up, the hood doubles as a bag into which the rest of the coat is pushed. It became very popular in the United Kingdom during the 1970s.

See also
Anorak (slang)
Capote (garment)
Goggle jacket
Hoodie
Mackintosh
Yup'ik clothing
The Anorak, a play about the Montreal Massacre written and performed by Adam Kelly

References

External links

A traditional Inuit parka at the Sheldon Jackson Museum, in Alaska

Jackets
History of fashion
1970s fashion
United States military uniforms
Coats (clothing)
Inuit clothing
Winter clothes